Anthology is the first box set by American singer Selena. It was released posthumously on April 7, 1998, through EMI Latin to commemorate the singer's works. The album contains 30 tracks on three discs, ten songs compiled in each genre-themed disc; "Pop / English" contains uptempo pop beats, "Mariachi" includes Mexican ballads with storylines of a broken heart, and "Cumbia" with danceable tropical music rhythms. Songs on the album range from a 14-year-old Selena on recordings taken from her Alpha (1986) album to the posthumously released "Disco Medley" (1997). With relatively few tracks in their original form, Anthology includes recordings redone and updated with newly remastered musical arrangements, though the singer's vocals remained untouched. The album was released as a result of the impact of Selena's death in March 1995, when the singer's father and manager Abraham Quintanilla began receiving requests from fans of her music. Following Selena's death, Abraham expressed his interest in persevering his daughter's memory through her music. Selena's family has been criticized by fans and the media for exploiting the singer and cannibalizing her murder by commercializing her repertoire. 

The album has received a positive response from music critics, Stephen Thomas Erlewine called Anthology a "comprehensive overview" of Selena's music career. Erlewine believed it provided listeners with an assortment of the singer's talents. This was a similar assessment on The Orlando Sentinel, where music critics found that Anthology provided listeners with Selena's abilities in recording songs of various genres. Anthology debuted at number one on the United States Billboard Top Latin Albums and Regional Mexican Albums chart, selling 10,500 units its debut week. It managed to peak at number 131 on the Billboard 200 chart, and remained atop the Regional Mexican Albums chart for 11 weeks, the most for any album on the chart for that year. Anthology ended 1998 as the best-selling album on the Regional Mexican Albums chart, while it placed 12th on the Top Latin Albums year-end chart. Anthology has been Diamond (Latin) by the Recording Industry Association of America (RIAA), denoting 600,000 units consisting of sales and on-demand streaming.

Background 
On March 31, 1995, American Tejano music singer Selena was shot and killed by Yolanda Saldívar, her friend and former manager of the singer's boutiques. At the time of her death the singer was working on a crossover album that would have propelled her into the American pop market. The impact of the singer's death had a negative impact on Latin music, her genre—which she catapulted into the mainstream market—suffered and its popularity waned following Selena's death. The crossover-planned album Dreaming of You was released posthumously on July 18, 1995, debuting and peaking atop the United States Billboard 200 albums chart, the first majority Spanish-language recording to do so in the chart's history. The album's release started a "buying frenzy" for anything related or containing Selena among Hispanic and Latino Americans. The releases of Selena's works continue a promise Abraham Quintanilla told his family following his daughter's death, that he will continue to keep Selena's memory alive through her music. According to A.B. Quintanilla, Suzette Quintanilla, and Selena collectively agreed that if anything were to happen to any one of them, their wish would be to continue on with their music. A.B. said that one of Selena's wishes was for her to "never go away". Since Selena's death, her family has been criticized by fans and the media for exploiting the singer and cannibalizing on her murder by commercializing her repertoire.

A biographical booklet written by Abraham is enclosed in Anthology. Abraham wrote how he had received requests from people asking for a collection of the singer's works, hoping the album "fits the bill". EMI Latin hailed it as the first collection by Selena to have been produced. Abraham describes his family's emotions during the production of Anthology as "a labor of love" and dedicated the album to Selena's fans, acknowledging them for helping Selena reach her musical aspirations.

Music 

Songs found in Anthology range from a 14-year-old Selena on recordings taken from her Alpha (1986) album to the posthumous club remix of "Disco Medley" (1997). According to EMI Latin, Anthology commemorates the singer's works, containing her earliest recordings to one of the last sessions before her death. With relatively few tracks in their original form, Anthology includes recordings redone and updated with newly remastered musical arrangements, though the singer's vocals remained untouched. The set contains tracks recorded by Selena prior to her contractual commitments with EMI Latin in 1989, while songs released during her tenure with the label were recorded under her father's studio Q-Productions. 

The first disc, titled and themed "Pop / English", opens with "Always Mine", an uptempo track that became the first English-language pop song recorded by Selena, a goal she and A. B. had since entering the music industry. The remix version of "No Quiero Saber" on Anthology, is taken from Voces Unidas, the official Latin album for the 1996 Atlanta Olympics. The third track, "Don't Throw Away My Love" is a remix version of Selena's first songwriting credit "My Love", taken from her 1989 debut album. The following song, "La Bamba" is a cover version of the same title recorded by Ritchie Valens in the 1950s. The next song, "I'm Getting Used to You" was remixed by David Morales. The next song, "Yo Fui Aquella" was originally a ranchera song and was redone with updated arrangements that transformed it into a ballad. The seventh track, "Captive Heart" was one of the last songs recorded by Selena before her death. The following tracks, "Amame" and "Missing My Baby" were originally on Entre a Mi Mundo (1992). "Disco Medley" (Club Remix) closes the track listing for the first disc. The track is a medley of disco-era songs "Last Dance" (1978) and "On the Radio" (1979) by Donna Summer, "The Hustle" (1975) by Van McCoy and the Soul City Symphony, and "I Will Survive" (1978) by Gloria Gaynor and "Funkytown" (1979) by Lipps Inc. "Disco Medley" was performed live at the Houston Astrodome on February 26, 1995, cited as her last concert before she was murdered. Writing for The Orlando Sentinel, music critics Natalie Pignato and Umatilla High found the first disc to retain its fast-paced accelerated beats from the first track to its last. 

Disc number two, titled and themed "Mariachi", opens with "El Ramalazo", and was recorded by Selena in 1986. The following track, "Dame Tu Amor", was the first song composed in collaboration between Abraham and keyboardist Ricky Vela in 1985. Track number three, "Pa'Qué Me Sirve La Vida", originally a ranchera, the updated arrangements on Anthology transformed it into a "mariachi-valseada". "Diferentes" was recorded by Selena in 1986 after listening to and liking Rocío Dúrcal's recording of it. The fifth song, "Siempre Hace Frío", was originally intended for the Don Juan DeMarco (1995) soundtrack, which was shelved by music producers. This was followed by "¿Qué Creias?", a song Selena often performed onstage with a male volunteer from the audience who portrayed her former lover, while Selena scorches them as the wronged partner. The seventh track, "Quiero Estar Contigo", was written by A. B. who utilized the accordion and keyboards in its original form in 1987, a period in which keyboard-driven tracks were at their peak in popularity. The following song, "Rama Caída" is one of the earliest recordings done by Selena when she was 14 years old. The following song, "Sabes" was written by Vela, and is particularly liked by Abraham who called it one of Vela's best works. The song is followed by the mariachi track "Tú Sólo Tú", which was also originally intended for the Don Juan DeMarco soundtrack, which closes the track listing for the second disc. The second disc contained a mellow presence throughout its track listing and featured Mexican ballads with storylines of a broken heart. 

"Yo Te Daré" opens the third disc, titled and themed "Cumbia". The song was modernized for Anthology, including "La Puerta Se Cerró". The former was originally a salsa track recorded in 1988 and was updated to sound similar to the arrangements found on "Si Una Vez" (1994). The third track, "Corazoncito" appears on Anthology in what Abraham calls "an even funkier arrangement." This is followed by "Enamorada de Ti" which opens as a downtempo ballad before transitioning into a danceable cumbia. Track number five, "No Debes Jugar" was originally released on Selena Live!. This was followed by "Cariño Mío", which was one of the most requested songs by fans for Selena to perform at her concerts in the 1980s. The song was updated from cumbia to a tropical salsa track. The next song, "Salta La Ranita", is updated with an accordion, which provides listeners with more layers of instrumentation compared to its bare original form. In the eighth song, "Te Amo Solo A Ti", producers on the album extracted Selena's vocals from the original track and placed it under a cumbia and ranchera hybrid rhythm. Abraham was surprised to have found the updated song to sound natural, noting the stark stylistic differences between cumbia and ranchera. The following song, "La Llamada" follows the protagonist's former lover calling her and protesting his innocence, not buying his excuses, she tells him to refrain from calling her again. "Baila Esta Cumbia", closes the track listing of the third disc and was previously on Ven Conmigo (1990). The third disc contained more of Selena's best works than the discs that proceeded it, according to critics Pignato and High.

Release and reception 

Anthology was released on April 7, 1998, and is a triple box set containing 30 tracks on three compact discs or cassette tapes; ten tracks on each genre-themed volume. The album has received a positive response from music critics. Writing for Allmusic, Stephen Thomas Erlewine called Anthology a "comprehensive overview" of Selena's music career that provides listeners with an assortment of the singer's talents, though found that the set is incomplete of Selena's best works such as "Dreaming of You" (1995). A similar review in The Orlando Sentinel echoed Erlewine's comments on Anthology, music critics Pignato and High believed it provided an example of Selena's talents in recording songs of various genres. They also opined that Anthology is the singer's "crossover dream come true", more so than its predecessors that were released posthumously, calling it a "must-have for fans." Richard Torres, a music critic for Newsday, suggested Anthology for those interested in listening to more songs by Selena, during his review for its successor All My Hits: Todos Mis Exitos (1999).

Commercial performance 
Fernando del Valle, writing for The Monitor, found several music retailers in the Rio Valley stocking Anthology ahead of its release. Laura Fajardo, manager of Camelot Music in Harlingen, Texas, noticed that "Selena fever" remains high, albeit not fanatically. The album debuted at number one on the US Billboard Top Latin Albums and Regional Mexican Albums chart on the issue dated April 25, 1998. Anthology marks the third consecutive Top Latin Album number-one debut for Selena, following Siempre Selena (1996) and Dreaming of You (1995). Anthology extended Selena's record of the most weeks an artist has spent at number one, 65 cumulative weeks atop the Top Latin Albums chart since Nielsen SoundScan began tabulating Latin album sales in 1993. The album sold 10,500 units, less than its predecessor Siempre Selena, which sold 14,500 units in its debut week, while the set debuted at number 144 on the Billboard 200. Sales of the album helped push Latin album sales in the United States above 90,000 units, for the first time in a month, as well as exceeding sales of Latin albums in the US of the same period in 1997. Anthology sold 3,500 more units than Ricky Martin's Vuelve, knocking it from the top spot.

Typically, the Mother's Day weekend holiday is one of the top-selling periods for Latin albums in the United States. Anthology sold 8,500 units, a 5% decrease from the previous tracking week. John Lannert of Billboard magazine was surprised that Anthology did not gain in sales that week. The album remained at number one on the Top Latin Albums and Regional Mexican Albums chart for its sixth consecutive week, while it dipped to number 151 on the Billboard 200 chart. Anthology remained atop the Regional Mexican Albums chart for 11 weeks, the most weeks an album has spent at number one, while it was the third most weeks at number one on the Top Latin Albums chart. Anthology helped EMI Latin to place third among best-performing record imprints on Billboards recap Latin music report. The album was placed at number nine in the Top Latin Albums recap report. Anthology ended 1998 as the best-selling regional Mexican album in the United States, while it placed 12th on the Top Latin Albums year-end chart. The set sold 116,000 units by December 1998, making it the best-selling album by EMI Latin for the year. The album was certified diamond by the Recording Industry Association of America (RIAA), denoting 600,000 units consisting of sales and on-demand streaming.

Track listing

Personnel 
Credits are adapted from the album's liner notes.

Musicians
 Selena –lead vocals
 Rolando Hernández –guitarist (tracks 1.04, 2.01—2.10, 3.02), vihuela (tracks 2.01—2.10, 3.02), background vocals (track 2.07)
 Roger Vera –trumpets (tracks 1.04, 2.01—2.10, 3.02)
 Mariachi Sol de Mexico – chorus (tracks 1.05, 1.10)
 Joe Murillo – guitarron (tracks 2.01—2.10, 3.02)
 Andy Wilson – violins (tracks 2.01—2.10, 3.02)
 Veronica Salinas – violins (tracks 2.01—2.10, 3.02)
 Tom McClung – violins (tracks 2.01—2.10, 3.02)
 Johnny Saenz – accordion (tracks 2.08, 3.01—3.10)
 Mateo Garcia – requinto (tracks 2.03, 2.05, 3.02)
 Mark Basaldua – background vocals (track 2.07)
 Jessie Garcia – background vocals (track 2.07)
 Jesse Ybarra – guitarist (tracks 3.01—3.04, 3.06—3.08)
 Favio Pinot – timbales (tracks 3.01—3.10)
 Lorena Pinot – background vocals (tracks 3.01—3.10)
 Suzette Quintanilla – drums (tracks 3.05, 3.09—3.10)
 Ricky Vela – keyboardist (tracks 3.05, 3.09—3.10)
 Joe Ojeda – keyboardist (tracks 3.05, 3.09—3.10)
 Chris Pérez – guitarist (tracks 3.05, 3.09—3.10)

Production
 Jose Behar – executive producer
 A. B. Quintanilla – producer, background vocals (track 2.07), remixer, arrangement (tracks 1.01, 1.02, 1.03, 1.05, 1.07, 1.10), bass (tracks 3.05, 3.09—3.10)
 Abraham Quintanilla – producer, liner notes
 Brian "Red" Moore – arrangement (tracks 1.04, 2.01—2.04, 2.06—2.09, 3.01—3.10), bass (tracks 3.01—3.04, 3.06—3.8)
 Ray Paz – producer, arrangement, remixer (tracks 1.04, 2.01—2.04, 2.06—2.09, 3.01—3.10), background vocals (track 2.07)
 David Morales – remixer (track 1.05)
 Los Dinos – arranger (tracks 1.09, 3.05, 3.09—3.10)
 José Hernández – arranger (tracks 2.05, 2.10)

Packaging
 Nelson Gonzalez – art & packagining, production coordinator
 Impressions Design – design, art direction

Charts

Weekly charts

Quarterly charts

Year-end charts

Certification

See also 

 List of number-one Billboard Top Latin Albums from the 1990s
 List of number-one Billboard Regional Mexican Albums of 1998
 List of number-one debuts on Billboard Top Latin Albums
 Billboard Regional Mexican Albums Year-end Chart, 1990s

References

Citations

Websites 

1998 compilation albums
1998 remix albums
Remix albums published posthumously
Compilation albums published posthumously
Selena compilation albums
Selena remix albums
EMI Latin compilation albums
Albums recorded at Q-Productions
Albums produced by A.B. Quintanilla